During the 1993–94 English football season, Peterborough United F.C. competed in the Football League First Division.

Season summary
Peterborough spent most of the season in the relegation zone and on 29 December, which had seen them win only 3 games overall and just 1 win in 15 league games, manager Lil Fuccillo was sacked and chairman Chris Turner became caretaker manager for rest of the season but was unable to save the Posh from relegation.

Final league table

Results
Peterborough United's score comes first

Legend

Football League First Division

FA Cup

League Cup

Anglo-Italian Cup

Squad
Squad at end of season

References

Peterborough United F.C. seasons
Peterborough United